Wolf (Wolf – Game ) is a 2019 Thai television series starring Toni Rakkaen, Sutatta Udomsilp (Punpun), Thitipoom Techaapaikhun (New), Jumpol Adulkittiporn (Off) and Kanaphan Puitrakul (First).

Directed by Nuttapong Mongkolsawas and produced by GMMTV, the series was one of the ten television series launched by GMMTV in their "Series X" event on 1 February 2018. Originally scheduled for 2018 release, it premiered on One31 and LINE TV on 25 January 2019, airing on Fridays at 22:00 ICT and 23:00 ICT, respectively. The series concluded on 26 April 2019.

Cast and characters 
Below are the cast of the series:

Main 
 Toni Rakkaen as Don
 Sutatta Udomsilp (Punpun) as Mo
 Thitipoom Techaapaikhun (New) as Plan
 Jumpol Adulkittiporn (Off) as Por
 Kanaphan Puitrakul (First) as Ryo

Supporting 
 Supoj Janjareon (Lift) as Ryo's father
 Trai Nimtawat (Neo) as Bank
 Juthapich Inn-Chan (Jamie) as Ashley
 Harit Cheewagaroon (Sing) as Kon
 Supanaree Sutichitwong (Fern) as Mew Mew

Guest role 
 Maria Poonlertlarp as Ben/Beer
 Chayanit Chansangavej (Pat) as Miss White
 Alysaya Tsoi (Alice) as Miss Black
 Pahun Jiyacharoen (Marc) as Mark
 Chinrat Siripongchawalit (Mike) as Tum
 Luke Ishikawa Plowden as Ken
 Uttsada Panichkul (Utt) as Patrick
 Suppanad Jittaleela (Tina) as Sam
 Paweenut Pangnakorn as Nida
 Ramida Jiranorraphat (Jane) as Ping
 Weerayut Chansook (Arm) as Tiger
 Ployshompoo Supasap (Jan) as Kwan
 Daweerit Chullasapya (Pae) as Robert
 Way-Ar Sangngern (Joss) as a bartender
 Sarocha Burintr (Gigie) as Grace
 Krittanai Arsalprakit (Nammon) as Payu
 Napasorn Weerayuttvilai (Puimek) as Yo
 Tipnaree Weerawatnodom (Namtan) as Pin
 Kay Lertsittichai (Kayavine) as Koji
 Nichaphat Chatchaipholrat (Pearwah) as Pauline
 Marisa Anita as Linda
 Dhanundhorn Neerasingh (Fang) as Jub-An
 Praeploy Oree

Soundtrack

References

External links 
 Wolf on One31 website 
 Wolf on LINE TV
 
 GMMTV

Television series by GMMTV
Thai action television series
2019 Thai television series debuts
2019 Thai television series endings
One 31 original programming